Diuranthera is a small genus of flowering plants in the family Asparagaceae, endemic to central China. The Bouyei people of China use a decoction of Diuranthera major to treat gynecological conditions.

Species
Currently accepted species include:

Diuranthera chinglingensis J.Q.Xing & T.C.Cui
Diuranthera inarticulata F.T.Wang & K.Y.Lang
Diuranthera major Hemsl.
Diuranthera minor (C.H.Wright) Hemsl.

References

Agavoideae
Asparagaceae genera
Endemic flora of China
Flora of North-Central China
Flora of South-Central China